MS/8 or The RL Monitor System is a discontinued computer operating system developed for the Digital Equipment Corporation PDP-8 in 1966 by Richard F. Lary.

History
RL Monitor System, as it was initially called, was developed on a 4K (12-bit) PDP-8 with "a Teletype that had a paper tape reader and punch and ..  a single DECtape." It was a disk oriented system, faster than its predecessor, the PDP-8 4K Disk Monitor System, with tricks to make it run quickly on DECtape based systems. 

Still named RL, it was submitted to DECUS in 1970. 

MS/8 has since been replaced by P?S/8 and COS-310.

See also
 PDP-8
 Digital Equipment Corporation

References

External links
 "What is a PDP-8?". PDP-8 and DECmate documentation files.

Free software operating systems
1966 software